Parapholis incurva is a species of grass native to Europe, Asia and northern Africa, and widely naturalised elsewhere. Common names include coast barbgrass, curved sea hard grass, curved hard-grass, sicklegrass, curved sicklegrass and curved parapholis.

Description
It is a tufted annual bunchgrass up to 30 centimetres high, with green flowers.

Taxonomy
It was first published as Aegilops incurva by Carl Linnaeus, and transferred into Parapholis by Charles Edward Hubbard in 1946.

Distribution and habitat
It is widespread in the old world, occurring in northern Africa, Europe, and Asia. It has widely naturalised elsewhere.

References

External links
 Jepson Manual Treatment
 USDA Plants Profile
 Grass Manual Treatment
 Photo gallery

Pooideae
Halophytes
Bunchgrasses of Africa
Bunchgrasses of Asia
Bunchgrasses of Europe
Flora of France
Grasses of India
Grasses of Pakistan
Flora of Algeria
Flora of Libya
Flora of Egypt
Flora of Morocco
Flora of Afghanistan
Flora of Cyprus
Flora of Georgia (country)
Flora of Greece
Flora of Iran
Flora of Iraq
Flora of Israel
Flora of Italy
Flora of Portugal
Flora of Palestine (region)
Flora of Russia
Flora of Spain
Flora of Turkey
Flora of Great Britain
Taxa named by Charles Edward Hubbard